Eudalaca zernyi is a species of moth of the family Hepialidae. It is known from Tanzania.

References

External links
Hepialidae genera

Endemic fauna of Tanzania
Moths described in 1950
Hepialidae
Insects of Tanzania
Moths of Africa